Diary of a Wimpy Kid: The Last Straw is a novel written by American author and cartoonist Jeff Kinney, the third book in the Diary of a Wimpy Kid series. The book acts as a journal and follows the adventures of Greg Heffley, the narrator of the book, who is in the second half of his seventh-grade year. This book was released in the US on January 13, 2009. An animated film based on the book is in the works for Disney+.

Plot
As the book begins, it is New Year's Day and Greg is talking about his family's New Year's resolutions. Greg’s resolution is to stop other people from breaking their resolutions. He starts a "three strikes and you're out" system; if anyone breaks their resolution, they will get a strike, but before Greg can decide what "you're out" means, Rodrick, Greg’s older brother, gets all three strikes. Greg decides to bag his resolution too, as everyone is breaking their resolutions and it’s very hard to keep on correcting people. Life becomes more difficult for Greg and his best friend Rowley when their school bus route is "rezoned" to the Whirley Street neighbourhood, meaning they have to walk to and from school. 

Greg also deals with being compared to the sons of his dad's boss, who all play sports and always seem to be outside exercising. Frank is jealous of this and wants his sons to be like his boss's sons. Conflicts rise over Greg wanting to stay inside and watch TV on Saturdays and Frank stealing his school snacks. The last straw is an incident at church on Easter, where Greg accidentally sits on his spoiled little brother Manny's chocolate bunny and stains the back of his pants with chocolate. He refuses to enter the church with the stained pants on for fear of having his crush, Holly Hills, thinking he soiled himself, so his mother allows him to wear her pink sweater like a kilt. Greg gets bored during the lengthy service and teases Manny, causing the latter to throw a tantrum in the process. The Heffley family is forced to leave, and Frank's boss sees everything, resulting in Frank becoming even more embarrassed than Greg, who had to walk past Holly. As a result, Frank makes Rodrick enroll in an SAT and makes Greg sign up for intramural soccer.

Greg does not like his soccer coach, Mr. Litch, who yells like a drill sergeant, lacks a sense of humour and runs intense drills during practice. In order to get out of this, he volunteers to be the backup goalie, but becomes the starter when the main goalie is injured. He takes a break to pick dandelions on the field, which ultimately costs his team their first loss. Frank is beyond embarrassed when his boss shows it to him in the paper at work, and does not speak to Greg at all that evening.

Later on, when Greg, Rodrick and Frank go to the cinema to watch a film, Frank runs into a past neighborhood troublemaker named Lenwood Heath, who has apparently reformed after going to Spag Union Military School. Impressed with his former enemy's turnaround, he decides to sign Greg up for a summer program at Spag Union, hoping Greg will change for the better but mostly hoping to end the embarrassment.

To impress his dad and thereby avoid military school, Greg decides to join the troop 133 Boy Scouts. This also allows him to quit soccer, as Boy Scout meetings are on Sundays. Greg gets sick and misses their camping trip, but Frank, as a chaperone, has to attend anyway. Frank ends up in the emergency room after two of the kids he was in charge of get into a fight and one gets seriously injured. Later, when Greg, Frank, and Rodrick have a camping "do-over", they end up at a hotel after heavy rain, where Rodrick tricks Greg into thinking Holly and her family are staying in the room across from theirs and locks Greg out of their room in his underwear. Greg doesn't know his room number, so he decides to hide out behind a vending machine to wait for his dad to come for him.

After this, Greg becomes more resigned to his military school fate, and makes multiple unsuccessful attempts to make a good impression on Holly. He gives up for good when he attempts to ask her to join him for a round at the roller skating rink, only for Holly to mistake him for Fregley, a weird kid whom Greg does not even wish to be associated with, due to Greg being forced to wear backup glasses after losing one of his contact lenses. Even worse, on the last day of school, Greg gets jealous upon finding a very sweet note from Holly in Rowley's yearbook, compared to Holly's note to Greg in his yearbook (although she did figure out who Greg really was). 

On what is supposed to be his only day of summer vacation before being sent to Spag Union, Greg is forced to spend it with his family at a half-birthday party hosted by their neighbours, the Snella family. The party features a contest where all the adults have to perform silly acts to make the baby laugh, while the Snellas record the acts to submit to America's Funniest Families (A parody of America's Funniest Home Videos and America's Funniest People) in an attempt to win a grand $10,000 cash prize. Greg notices that Manny has been rooting around the presents and found their mother's gift for the baby, a blanket just exactly like the one Manny got for his first birthday. He tries to stop Manny from taking the blanket for himself, but Manny throws it onto a tree. Greg attempts to climb the tree to retrieve the blanket, but he gets stuck and calls for help, only for his pants to fall down and reveal his Wonder Woman underwear (which he only wore because he had fallen behind on his laundry and had to borrow a pair of pants from Rodrick, which are three sizes too big). The Snella family managed to record everything, but since the incident happened right before Frank's turn to perform for the baby, Frank no longer has to perform. Frank gives Greg credit for staging the whole thing.

The next morning, Frank reconsiders his decision to send Greg to Spag Union, which Greg perceives as being out of gratitude for saving him from embarrassment the previous day. Greg goes to Rowley's house, where they are greeted by their new neighbour, a girl their age named Trista. Greg sees an opportunity to impress her by taking her with Rowley to his parents' country club. The book ends with Greg looking forward to his summer vacation with his friends.

Reception
The Last Straw received positive reviews. Positive attention was once again given to the character of Greg Heffley, with him being considered relatable. The books' style of deadpan humor was also well received.

Adaptations

On August 3, 2012, a film based on this book, The Last Straw, as well as the subsequent book, Dog Days, was released; the movie starred Zachary Gordon, Steve Zahn, Robert Capron, Devon Bostick, Rachael Harris, Peyton List, Grayson Russell and Karan Brar. Principal photography began on August 8, 2011 in Vancouver and was completed on October 7, 2011. A poster was leaked in March 2012. A teaser trailer was attached to The Three Stooges. An advance screening for the film was held on July 31, 2012. In December 2022, Kinney confirmed an adaptation of The Last Straw is in the works for Disney+.

References

Diary of a Wimpy Kid
2009 American novels
Novels by Jeff Kinney
American novels adapted into films
Amulet Books books
2009 children's books